Drama (Perifereiakí Enótita Drámas) is one of the regional units of Greece. It is part of the Region of East Macedonia and Thrace. Its capital is the town of Drama. The regional unit is the northernmost within the geographical region of Macedonia and the westernmost in the administrative region of East Macedonia and Thrace. The northern border with Bulgaria is formed by the Rhodope Mountains.

Geography
The northern part of the regional unit, bordering Bulgaria, is very mountainous. The main mountain ranges are Orvilos ( - Slavyanka) in the northwest, Falakro in the north (at 2232m the highest point of the regional unit), the western Rhodope Mountains in the northeast (including mounts Frakto, Elatia, Koula etc.) and Menoikio in the southwest. The Nestos is the longest river, flowing in the northeast. The northern portion holds a unique treasure known as Karantere (or Forest of Elatia).

Drama is surrounded by the regional units of Xanthi to the east, Kavala to the south, Serres to the southwest and to the west, and the Bulgarian provinces of Blagoevgrad and Smolyan to the north.  Arable lands are located in the southern and the westcentral portion of Drama.

The southern part mainly has a Mediterranean climate. The climate is more continental with cold winters in higher elevations and in the northern part.

Administration

The Drama regional unit is subdivided into 5 municipalities. These are (number as in the map in the infobox):
Doxato (2)
Drama (1)
Kato Nevrokopi (3)
Paranesti (4)
Prosotsani (5)

Prefecture

As a part of the 2011 Kallikratis government reform, the former Drama Prefecture was transformed into a regional unit within the East Macedonia and Thrace region. The prefecture had the same territory as the present regional unit. At the same time, the municipalities were reorganised, according to the table below.

According to the 2011 census, the Drama regional unit had a population of 98,287, 11,666 more inhabitants than in the 2021 census.

Transport
The main roads of Drama regional unit are Greek National Road 12 (Thessaloniki - Serres - Drama - Kavala), Greek National Road 14 (Drama - Xanthi) and Greek National Road 57 (Drama - Kato Nevrokopi - Bulgaria). The Thessaloniki–Alexandroupoli railway passes through Drama and Paranesti.

See also
List of settlements in the Drama regional unit
Former toponyms of places in Drama Prefecture

References 

 
Regional units of Eastern Macedonia and Thrace
Prefectures of Greece